This is a list of ambassadors of Austria to the United States.

The United States first established diplomatic relations with Austria in 1838 during the time of the Austrian Empire. Relations between the United States have been continuous since that time except for two interruptions during World War I and World War II.

The Austrian Embassy in the United States is located in Washington, D.C.

Austro-Hungarian Ambassadors 
 1838–1841 Baron Wenzel de Mareschal
 1844–1850 August Belmont (as Consul-General) 
 1841–1863 Johann von Hülsemann
 1863–1864 Nikolaus von Giorgi
 25.01.1865–11.08.1867 Ferdinand Freiherr von Wydenbruck (1816–1878)
 11.08.1867-03.07.1868 Karl von und zu Franckenstein
 03.07.1868–12.03.1874 Karl Freiherr von Lederer (1817–1890)
 12.03.1874–08.03.1875 Wilhelm Freiherr von Schwarz-Senborn (1813–1903)
 23.06.1875–28.08.1878 Ladislaus Graf von Hoyos-Sprinzenstein  
 25.12.1878–30.10.1881 Ernst Freiherr von Mayr
 30.10.1881–09.10.1886 Ignaz Freiherr von Schäffer  
 21.02.1887–11.10.1894 Ernst Ritter Schmit von Tavera (1839–1904)
 11.10.1894–07.01.1913 Ladislaus Hengelmüller von Hengervár (1845–1917)
 04.03.1913–04.11.1915 Dr. Konstantin Dumba (1856–1947)
 09.11.1916–08.04.1917 Adam Graf Tarnówski von Tarnów (1866–1946)

Ambassadors of the Austrian Republic 

 Edgar L. G. Prochnik
 Title: Chargé d'affaires a.i.
 Presented credentials: 2 December 1921
 Title: Envoy Extraordinary and Minister Plenipotentiary
 Presented credentials: 7 May 1925
 Terminated mission: Anschluss with Germany, 13 March 1938
 Ludwig Kleinwächter
 Title: Envoy Extraordinary and Minister Plenipotentiary
 Appointed: 26 November 1946
 Presented credentials: 4 December 1946
 Title: Ambassador Extraordinary and Plenipotentiary
 Appointed: 6 December 1951
 Presented credentials: 19 December 1951
 Max Loewenthal
 Title: Ambassador Extraordinary and Plenipotentiary
 Appointed: 5 February 1952
 Presented credentials: 13 February 1952
 Karl Gruber
 Title: Ambassador Extraordinary and Plenipotentiary
 Appointed: 3 March 1954
 Presented credentials: 10 March 1954
 Wilfried Platzer
 Title: Ambassador Extraordinary and Plenipotentiary
 Appointed: 9 April 1958
 Presented credentials: 18 April 1958
 Ernst Lemberger
 Title: Ambassador Extraordinary and Plenipotentiary
 Appointed: 12 October 1965
 Presented credentials: 16 November 1965
 Karl Gruber
 Title: Ambassador Extraordinary and Plenipotentiary
 Appointed: 18 June 1969
 Presented credentials: 1 July 1969
 Arno Halusa
 Title: Ambassador Extraordinary and Plenipotentiary
 Appointed: 1 September 1972
 Presented credentials: 7 September 1972
 Karl Herbert Schober
 Title: Ambassador Extraordinary and Plenipotentiary
 Appointed: 2 March 1977
 Presented credentials: 23 March 1977
 Thomas Klestil
 Title: Ambassador Extraordinary and Plenipotentiary
 Appointed: 8 January 1982
 Presented credentials: 13 January 1982
 Friedrich Hoess
 Title: Ambassador Extraordinary and Plenipotentiary
 Appointed: 30 November 1987
 Presented credentials: 21 December 1987
 Helmut Tuerk
 Title: Ambassador Extraordinary and Plenipotentiary
 Appointed: 4 February 1993
 Presented credentials: 14 April 1993
 Peter Moser
 Title: Ambassador Extraordinary and Plenipotentiary
 Appointed: 19 April 1999
 Presented credentials: 19 April 1999
 Eva Nowotny
 Title: Ambassador Extraordinary and Plenipotentiary
 Appointed: 22 October 2003
 Presented credentials: 4 December 2003
 Christian Prosl
 Title: Ambassador Extraordinary and Plenipotentiary
 Appointed: 26 May 2009
 Presented credentials: 20 July 2009
 Hans Peter Manz
 Title: Ambassador Extraordinary and Plenipotentiary
 Appointed: 2 December 2011
 Presented credentials: 18 January 2012
 Wolfgang Waldner
 Title: Ambassador Extraordinary and Plenipotentiary
 Appointed: 14 January 2016
 Presented credentials: 28 January 2016
 Martin Weiss
 Title: Ambassador Extraordinary and Plenipotentiary
 Appointed: 7 November 2019
 Presented credentials: 6 January 2020

Notes and references 
United States Department of State: Ambassadors of Austria
Austrian Embassy Washington, DC: Former Ambassadors

See also
Austria–United States relations
United States Ambassador to Austria
Foreign relations of Austria

Unit
 
Aus